Kugluktuk Airport  is located at Kugluktuk, Nunavut, Canada, and is operated by the Government of Nunavut.

Airlines and destinations

Cargo

References

External links

Certified airports in the Kitikmeot Region